HMS Lynx was a  which served with the Royal Navy.  She was launched in 1894 and sold in 1912.

Construction
In April 1892, the British Admiralty sent out a request to several shipbuilders for designs and tenders for "large sea going torpedo boats", or what later became known as "Torpedo Boat Destroyers", to be built under the 1892–1893 shipbuilding programme. In January 1893, an order was placed for two ships with Laird & Co., following on from orders placed in July the previous year with the specialist torpedo boat builders Yarrows and Thornycroft.

Four funnels were fitted.

As a torpedo boat, the planned armament was a single QF 12 pounder 12 cwt ( calibre) gun on a platform on the ship's conning tower (in practice the platform was also used as the ship's bridge) and one six-pounder (57mm) gun aft, with a single fixed 18 inch (450 mm) torpedo tube in the ship's bow and two more 18 inch tubes on a rotating mount. As a gunboat, the two swivelling  torpedo tubes could be removed to accommodate a further two six-pounders.

Lynx was laid down at Laird's Birkenhead shipyard on 1 July 1893 as yard number 597 and was launched on 24 January 1894. She carried out sea trials in August 1894, successfully reaching the contract speed of 27 knots, but had problems steering when running astern, and was not completed until August 1895.

Service history
On 26 December 1894, Lynx ran aground off the coast of Cornwall, receiving serious damage. Lynx took part in the Royal Navy's annual manoeuvres in July 1896. On 26 June 1897 she was present at the Jubilee Fleet Review at Spithead. On 30 September 1897, Lynx and the destroyer  ran aground in thick fog off Dodman Point in Cornwall. A steam main aboard Thrasher ruptured as a result of the impact, killing four stokers, with Lynx less badly damaged. Both ships were refloated, with Lynx sailing to Devonport for repair. While Thrashers commanding officer was severely reprimanded for "reckless navigation" in the resulting Court Martial, Lynxs commanding officer was acquitted.

In 1902 she served in the Channel Squadron, underwent repairs to re-tube her boilers in May, and took part in the Coronation Review for King Edward VII in August.

In February 1908, inspection revealed that Lynxs deck plating and bulkheads were rusting through. On 10 April 1912, she was sold for scrap to Ward's of Preston.

Notes

References

Sources

 

Ferret-class destroyers
1894 ships
Ships built on the River Mersey
Maritime incidents in 1897